The Christmas Gift of the Year or Christmas Present of the Year is a kind of "award" given to a special product each year by the Swedish Retail Institute, in time before Christmas.

Christmas Gift of the Year throughout the years
1988 – bread machine
1989 – camcorder
1990 – wok
1991 – CD player
1992 – video game
1993 – perfume
1994 – mobile telephone
1995 – Compact Disc
1996 – Internet
1997 – digital pet, for example Tamagotchi
1998 – computer game
1999 – books 
2000 – DVD player
2001 – tools
2002 – cookbook – declared by reduced value-added tax on books, TV-cooks and a revival in the interest for cooking food
2003 – knit cap
2004 – flat panel TV set
2005 – Poker set
2006 – audiobook
2007 – GPS navigation device
2008 – an experience 
2009 – bed of nails
2010 – tablet computer
2011 – packed bag of groceries
2012 – headphones
2013 – juicer
2014 – fitness tracker
2015 – robotic vacuum cleaner
2016 – virtual reality headset
2017 – electric bicycle
2018 – recycled garment
2019 – A box for mobile telephones
2020 - portable stove
2021 – event ticket
2022 – Home-knitted wear

References 

Awards established in 1988
1988 establishments in Sweden
Christmas in Sweden
Christmas economics